Luigi Borgomainerio (1836 – 1876) was an Italian engraver and caricaturist, who was active in the late 19th century.

Born at Como in 1836, Borgomainerio was one of the cleverest caricaturists in the Spirito Folletto, and the founder of the Mefistofele. Subsequently, he went to Brazil to engage in similar work for a comic paper, but died at Rio Janeiro in 1876, soon after his arrival.

References

1836 births
1876 deaths
People from Como
19th-century Italian painters
Italian male painters
Italian printmakers
Italian caricaturists
19th-century Italian male artists